Alaca may refer to the following places in Turkey:

 Alaca, Çorum, a large district in Çorum Province
 Alaca Dam
 Alaca, Borçka, a village in Artvin Province
 Alaca, Beşiri, a village in Batman Province
 Alaca, Elâzığ, a village in Elâzığ Province
 Alaca, Aydıntepe, a village in Bayburt Province
 Alaca, Kulp, a village in Diyarbakır Province
 Alaca, Aziziye, a neighbourhood in Erzurum Province
 Alaca, Hınıs, a village in Erzurum Province
 Alaca, İnebolu, a village in Kastamonu Province
 Alaca, Köprüköy

See also 
 Alaca Höyük, an archaeological site in Turkey
 Alaja (disambiguation)